Abbas Ibrahim (born August 13, 1940) is a Maldivian politician. He is the brother-in-law of former President Maumoon Abdul Gayoom. Ibrahim is a former speaker of the Special Constitutional Majlis (parliament) of the Maldives from its convocation in 2004 to 2006.

Background
He is from Endherimaage in Malé.  His sister Nasreena Ibrahim was the First Lady of the Maldives from 1977 to 2008, and his brother Ilyas Ibrahim is the former Minister for Health and MP for Laamu Atoll. 
When Ilyas Ibrahim was tried in absentia in 1993 Abbas Ibrahim was removed from his post as Minister of Fisheries and Agriculture.

Abbas Ibrahim was selected by the president as the Speaker of the Special Constitutional Majlis in 2004 after a 'show of hands' election, in defiance of the constitutional requirement for a secret vote. To enforce his election, Gayoom demanded a 'show of hands' among Majlis members.

Abbas Ibrahim was the son of Ibrahim Abbas (born Abdul Gadir and formerly known as Dhon Maniku). He was a wealthy trader and advisor to Mohamed Amin Didi who ruled from 1944 until 1953 first as Home Minister and then President for less than a year. Abbas Ibrahim's father was a self-made man who received high 'beykalun' status late in life. As Ibrahim Nasir rose to power, he was working as a trusted servant of Muhammad Fareed Didi. He served his leaders faithfully and became boss of Maafannu, one of Malé's four wards. Together with his brother Ilyas Ibrahim, Abbas Ibrahim inherited control of Maafannu from his father. Abbas was a highly political ward leader like his father.

References

External links
Abbas Ibrahim's biography

Members of the People's Majlis
1940 births
Living people
Government ministers of the Maldives